Van Beveren is a surname. Notable people with the surname include:

Charles Van Beveren (1809–1850), Belgian artist
Jan van Beveren (1948–2011), Dutch footballer and manager
Mattheus van Beveren, 17th-century Flemish sculptor and medallist
Nicolas van Beveren (born c. 1983), Seychellois-born French actor and film director
Wil van Beveren (1911–2003), Dutch sprinter

See also
Beveren (disambiguation)